Joshua Adam Deahl (born February 13, 1981) is an American attorney  who has served as an associate judge on the District of Columbia Court of Appeals since January 2020.

Education and career 
Deahl earned his Bachelor of Arts from Arizona State University in 2003 and his Juris Doctor from University of Michigan Law School in 2006.

After graduating from law school, Deahl clerked for Court of Appeals for the Fifth Circuit Judge Fortunato Benavides and Supreme Court Justices Sandra Day O’Connor and Anthony Kennedy. Deahl worked as an attorney for the Public Defender Service for the District of Columbia and in private practice.

District of Columbia Court of Appeals 
On June 29, 2017, President Donald Trump nominated Deahl to the District of Columbia Court of Appeals. His nomination expired on January 4, 2019, with the end of the 115th United States Congress.

Trump renominated Deahl on May 2, 2019, to a 15-year term as an associate judge on the District of Columbia Court of Appeals to the seat vacated by Eric T. Washington. On October 22, 2019, the Senate Committee on Homeland Security and Governmental Affairs held a hearing on his nomination. On November 6, 2019, the Committee reported his nomination favorably to the senate floor. On November 21, 2019, the full Senate confirmed his nomination by voice vote. He was sworn in on January 6, 2020.

See also 
 List of law clerks of the Supreme Court of the United States (Seat 1)
 List of law clerks of the Supreme Court of the United States (Seat 8)

References

External links

Official bio of Judge Deahl

1981 births
Living people
21st-century American judges
Arizona State University alumni
Judges of the District of Columbia Court of Appeals
Law clerks of the Supreme Court of the United States
People from Tucson, Arizona
Public defenders
University of Michigan alumni